Wyl Menmuir (born 1979) is a British novelist, best known for his debut novel, The Many, which was longlisted for the Man Booker Prize in 2016. He was born in Stockport, in Greater Manchester, and grew up in nearby Romiley. He was educated at Marple Hall School, Ridge Danyers College, the University of Newcastle and Manchester Metropolitan University. He now lives on the north coast of Cornwall.

Works
 The Many (2016) 
 In Dark Places (2017)
 Fox Fires (2021)

References

External links
 Wyl Menmuir web site

Living people
1979 births
21st-century English novelists